Healthful Indian Flavors with Alamelu is an Indian cooking television program produced by Milwaukee Public Television in the United States. It is hosted by Alamelu Vairavan, with occasional dietetic and nutritional commentary by Margaret Pfeiffer, a registered dietitian and expert in preventive cardiology. It was first broadcast on PBS in May 2010.

Vairavan was born and raised in the town of Kandanur in the Chettinad region of Tamil Nadu in South India. She married K. Vairavan and moved to the United States at the age of 18 in 1967, and learned how to cook from her aunt and uncle's professional Chettinad chef, Nedungudi Natesan, in New York. She earned a degree in Health Information Management at the University of Wisconsin-Milwaukee in 1983. She has two children, a son Ashok and a daughter Valli. Vairavan works to promote healthy cooking and eating to the American public. Her show can be seen currently on the PBS (Public Broadcasting Service) channel Create TV.

List of episodes 

Click on episode number links to watch them.

Season 1

Season 2

References

External links 
 Series website

Indian cuisine outside India
English-language television shows
PBS original programming
2010s American cooking television series
2010 American television series debuts